This lists significant accidents involving railway rolling stock, including crashes, fires and incidents of crew being overcome by locomotive emissions. Other railway-related incidents such as the King's Cross fire of 1987 or the 7 July 2005 London bombings are not included.

Worst accidents
The worst accident was the Quintinshill rail disaster in Scotland in 1915 with 226 dead and 246 injured. Second worst, and the worst in England, was the 1952 Harrow and Wealdstone rail crash, which killed 112 people and injured 340. The death toll from the 1957 Lewisham rail crash was 90; for the 1889 Armagh rail disaster (the worst in Northern Ireland) it was 80; and for the 1879 Tay Bridge disaster it was 75. The worst rail accident in Wales was the 1868 Abergele rail disaster, with 33 dead.

The accident on the London Underground with the highest loss of life was the Moorgate tube crash which occurred on the Northern City Line in 1975 (at the time it was part of the London Underground Network).

Mainline rail

1830–1922: Pre-grouping

Before 1830 the Philadelphia (UK) boiler explosion 1815, a boiler explosion of "Brunton's Mechanical Traveller" on a plateway had killed 16 people, mainly sightseers.

1923–1947: The Big Four (railway companies)

1948–1994: British Railways/Rail

1995 onwards: Post-privatisation

London Underground

Despite its age and high usage, train related accidents which have involved passenger fatalities are exceptionally rare. The last major fatal collision was the Moorgate tube crash in 1975. Derailments in the period 2003–2004 did not cause fatalities, although the Chancery Lane derailment in 2003 led to a closure of the Central line whilst urgent safety checks were undertaken.

Tram and light rail

Fatal accidents have occurred involving trams; the worst took place in Dover in 1917, when a tram ran away down a hill and overturned, killing 11 people and injuring 60. In 2016, a tram derailed on a sharp bend and overturned in Croydon, killing seven people and injuring 50.

Gallery

See also 
 Great Western Railway accidents
 List of rail accidents by country
 List of rail accidents worldwide
 List of train accidents by death toll

Notes

References

Sources

External links

 Rail Accident Investigation Branch – Investigation Reports
 Health & Safety; Office of Rail and Road
 A Time Line for Policing the Railways
 Railways Archive
 The Railways Archive
 Guardian unlimited – Rail Accidents Chronology
 BBC News – Chronology of British Rail Crashes
 Clayton Tunnel
 UK train accidents in which passengers were killed 1825–1924
 

Lists of railway accidents and incidents in the United Kingdom